Rachiplusia virgula is a species of moth in the family Noctuidae. It is found in Chile.

References

External links 

 Rachiplusia virgula in the Global Lepidoptera Names Index

Plusiinae
Moths described in 1852
Moths of South America
Endemic fauna of Chile